This is a list of schools in Longhua District, Shenzhen.

Shenzhen municipal schools
Schools operated by the Shenzhen municipal government in Longhua District include:
 Shenzhen Senior High School North Campus (北校区)
 Shenzhen Second Foreign Languages School (深圳第二外国语学校) - Dashuikeng Community, Guanlan Subdistrict

Longhua district schools

Twelve-year schools

 Boheng Experimental School (博恒实验学校) - Hongwanbang Science & Technology Park, Tongfucun, Dalang Subdistrict
 Longhua Chinese-English Experimental School (龙华中英文实验学校)
 Merchiston International School - Dalang Subdistrict
 Shenzhen China-US School (美中学校) - Guanlan Sub-district
 Zhanhua Experimental School (展华实验学校)

Secondary schools

 Grit Academy (格睿特高级中学) - Shangkeng Community, Guanhu Subdistrict
  (观澜中学) - Guanlan Subdistrict
 Guanlan No. 2 Middle School (观澜第二中学) - Guanlan Subdistrict
 Houde Academy (厚德书院)
 Longhua Middle School	(龙华中学) - Longhua Subdistrict
 Longhua Senior High School Education Group (龙华高级中学教育集团) - Minzhi Subdistrict
 Shenzhen Gezhi Academy (深圳市格致中学) - Minzhi Subdistrict
 Shenzhen Hongshan Middle School (深圳市红山中学)
 Xinhua Middle School (新华中学) - Longhua Subdistrict

Nine-year schools

 No. 2 Experimental School (第二实验学校) - Block 12, Yicheng Center
 No. 3 Experimental School	(第三实验学校) - Block A, Tongfucun Industrial Zone, Dalang Community, Dalang Sub-district
 School Affiliated to Longhua Institute of Education Sciences (龙华区教育科学研究院附属学校) - Fucheng Subdistrict
 Aifu Experimental School (爱孚实验学校) - Block B, Dashuitian, Niuhu Community, Guanlan Subdistrict
 Aiyi School (爱义学校) - Dalang Subdistrict
 Baowen School (宝文学校) - Guanlan Subdistrict
 Bowen School (博文学校)
 Bromsgrove School Mission Hills - Guanlan Subdistrict
 Dalang Experimental School (大浪实验学校)
 Experimental School (实验学校)
 Foreign Languages School Affiliated to Shenzhen Institute of Education Sciences of Longhua District (深圳市龙华区教育科学研究院附属外国语学校) - Longhua Subdistrict
 Gaofeng School (高峰学校) - Gaofeng Community, Dalang Sub-district
 Guanlan Central School (观澜中心学校) - Guanlan Subdistrict
 Jinhua Experimental School (锦华实验学校) - Taoxia Village, Dalang Subdistrict
 Jinming School (锦明学校) - Daba Section, Dabuxiang Village, Guanlan Subdistrict
 Liuyi School (六一学校) - Minzhi Sub-district
 Longfeng School (龙丰学校) - Niudipu, Longhua Subdistrict
 Longhua Foreign Languages School (龙华区外国语学校) - Guanhu Subdistrict
 Longhua Innovation Experimental School (龙华区创新实验学校) - Longhua Subdistrict
 Longhua Institute of Education Sciences Affiliated School (龙华区教育科学研究院附属学校) - Minzhi Subdistrict
 Longhua Institute of Education Sciences Affiliated Experimental School (龙华区教育科学研究院附属实验学校) -  Minzhi Subdistrict
 Longhua Qingquan Foreign Languages School (龙华区清泉外国语学校) - Longhua Subdistrict
 Longteng School (深圳市龙华区龙腾学校) - Minzhi Subdistrict
 Niulanqian School	(牛栏前学校) - Niulanqian Village, Minzhi Subdistrict
 Qianlong School (潜龙学校) - Minzhi Subdistrict
 Sanlian Yongheng School (三联永恒学校) - Longhua Subdistrict
 Shenzhen Foreign Languages School Longhua Campus (深圳外国语学校龙华校区) - Shenzhen North Railway Station Area, Minzhi Subdistrict
 Shenzhen Longhua Hanwen Experimental School (深圳市龙华区翰文实验学校) - Building 8 Qilin Industrial Zone, Xintian Community, Guanhu Sub-district
 Shenzhen Longhua Minzhi Middle School Education Group (深圳市龙华区民治中学教育集团) - Minzhi Subdistrict
 Shenzhen Longhua Minzhi Middle School Education Group Minxin School (深圳市龙华区民治中学教育集团民新学校)
 Shenzhen Longhua Nord Bilingual School (深圳市龙华区诺德双语学校) - Guanlan Subdistrict
 Shenzhen Longhua Second Foreign Languages School (深圳市龙华区第二外国语学校) - Dalang Subdistrict
 Shenzhen Longhua Vanke Bilingual School (深圳市龙华区万科双语学校) - Minzhi Subdistrict
 Shenzhen Longhua Xingzhi School (深圳市龙华区行知学校) - Fucheng Subdistrict
 Shenzhen Longhua Zhenneng School (深圳市龙华区振能学校) -Songyuanxia Community, Guanlan Subdistrict
 South China Experimental School (华南实验学校) - Minzhi Subdistrict
 Tongsheng School (同胜学校) - Shanghenglang Village, Dalang Subdistrict
 Wan'an School	(万安学校) - Guanlan Subdistrict
 Xinyuan School (新园学校) - Mali Village, Guanlan Sub-district
 Xinzhi School	(新智学校) - Tangqian Village, Zhangge Community, Guanlan Subdistrict
 Yulong School	(玉龙学校)

Primary schools

 The Affiliated Primary School of Educational Science Research Institute of Shenzhen (教科院附属小学) - Innovation Industrial Park, Guanhu Subdistrict, Longhua District
 Bilan Foreign Language Primary School (碧澜外国语小学) - Guanlan Subdistrict
 Dandi Experimental School	(丹堤实验学校) - Fengzehu Mountain Villa
 Defeng Primary School	(德风小学) - Junzibu Community, Guanlan Sub-district
 Dongxing Primary School (东星小学) - Baishilong Village, Minzhi Subdistrict
 Dunbei Primary School	(墩背小学) - Dunbei Community, Longhua Subdistrict
 Guangpei Primary School (广培小学) - Niuhu Community, Guanlan Subdistrict
 Guanlan No. 2 Primary School (观澜第二小学)
 Guihua Primary School	(桂花小学) - Guanlan Subdistrict
 Heping Experimental Primary School (和平实验小学)
 Longhua No. 2 Primary School (龙华第二小学) - Gong Village
 Longhua Central Primary School (龙华中心小学) - Longhua Subdistrict
 Longlan Primary School (龙澜学校) - Dashuikeng Community, Guanlan Subdistrict
 Longwei Primary School (龙为小学) - Longhua Subdistrict
 Luhu Foreign Language Primary School (鹭湖外国语小学) - Guanhu Subdistrict
 Minle Primary School (民乐小学) - Block 1, Minle Village, Minzhi Subdistrict
 Minzhi Primary School	(民治小学)
 Qinghu Primary School	(清湖小学)
 Shenzhen Longhua Huayu Primary School (华育小学) - Longhua Subdistrict
 Shenzhen Longhua Minshun Primary School (民顺小学) - Minzhi Subdistrict
 Shuxiang Primary School (书香小学) - Minzhi Subdistrict
 Songhe Primary School	(松和小学) - Longhua Subdistrict
 Weilai Primary School	(未来小学)
 Wenfeng Primary School (文峰小学) - Tianliao Industrial Zone, Dahe Community
 Xingzhi Primary School (行知小学) - Building 1, Phase 4, Jinxiu Jiangnan Estate, Minzhi Sub-district
 Xingzhi Experimental Primary School (行知实验小学) - Minzhi Subdistrict
 Yuanfen Primary School (元芬小学) - Yuanfen Village, Dalang Subdistrict
 Yuying Primary School	(育英小学) - Building 13, Shangzaohe Industrial Zone, Dalang Subdistrict

Notes

References

Longhua District, Shenzhen
Longhua